The 1971–72 National KO Competition was the first rugby union cup competition (for clubs) in England.  Gloucester won the competition defeating Moseley in the final. In the final the Moseley lock Nigel Horton floored Dick Smith (the Gloucester openside) with a punch during the second scrum of the game and was sent off by Ron Lewis the referee. Moseley ended the game with just twelve men after their two flankers, Tim Smith and Ian Pringle, were both carried off injured.

The RFU introduced this new challenge cup which quickly emerged as England's premier Rugby Union club competition event. The final was held at Twickenham Stadium. The principal event for Rugby Union club players at this time had been the County Championship because there was no official league table for clubs.

Draw and results

First round

Second round

Quarter-finals

Semi-finals

Final

References

John Player Cup
John Player Cup
RFU Knockout Cup